Khanapur officially known as Khanapura is a panchayat town in Belagavi district, Karnataka, India.  It is about 26 km from Belagavi. The town is governed by the Khanapur Municipal Council. Khanapur is the headquarters for Khanapur taluk. The town is on the Belgaum-Panaji National Highway,  NH 4A. Khanapur is well connected by train and road to important cities in Karnataka, Goa, and Maharashtra. Kannada  is the official language but Marathi is widely spoken in the town.

Geography 

Demographics 
In the 2001 census, the town of Khanapur had 16,567 inhabitants, with 8,474 males (51.1%) and 8,093 females (48.9%), for a gender ratio of 955 females per thousand males.

In the 2011 census, the town of Khanapur had 18,535 inhabitants.

Languages
Even though Kannada is the administrative language, Marathi language is the most widely spoken language in Khanapur followed by Kannada, Urdu and Konkani languages.

Tourism, attractions, and economy
Khanapur's economy is agriculture-based and is noted for its cultivation of crops such as sugarcane, rice, nachani (millet), and fruits including chikoo, guava, and jackfruit. It is also famous for food items such as churmure (puffed rice) and jaggery.

Khanapur is famous for its national level pottery training centre, the Central Village Pottery Institute, which is run by khadi and  a village industries commission on the banks of the Malaprabha River, where excellent pottery training is given in Redware and Whiteware technology. Also, a tourist spot in Khanapur is Chouda Musi, a small British era bridge constructed over a small dam.

Other Attractions in and around Khanapur
 Kadamba period Bhuvaraha Narasimha temple at Halasi
 Kadamba style Kamala Narayana Temple is at Degaon
 Asoga - A village named Asoga on the banks of Malaprabha river is very attractive tourist place famous for its temple. This temple was built during the reign of Kadamba kings in the medieval period. Important scenes from the 1970s hit movie 'Abhimaan' (featuring Amithabh Bacchan and Jaya bhaduri) were shot near the river Malaprabha at Asoga. The entire song 'Nadiya kinare' has been shot there.
 Modekopon the banks of Malaprabha river is very attractive tourist
 Bhimgad Wildlife Sanctuary
 Gadikopp Shree guru Raghavendra Swami Matha

See also
 Adi (Khanapur)
 The Kalasa-Banduri Nala project
 Halasi
 Kadegaon
 Kittur
 Kamala Narayana Temple
 Degaon
 Sangolli Rayanna
 Modekop
 Jatage

References

External links

 Taluka Website
 Town Website

Cities and towns in Belagavi district